{{DISPLAYTITLE:C2H5N3O2}}
The molecular formula C2H5N3O2 (molar mass: 103.08 g/mol, exact mass: 103.0382 u) may refer to:

 Biuret
 N-Nitroso-N-methylurea (NMU)